= Sohbat Khan =

- Location within Pakistan
- Coordinates: 27.46°N 67.44°E
- Country: Pakistan
- Province: Balochistan
- Elevation: 32 m (105 ft)
- Time zone: UTC+5 (PST)

Sohbat Khan is a village in the Balochistan province of Pakistan. It is located at 27°46'0N 67°44'10E with an altitude of 32 metres (108 feet).
